The Indian Public High School (IPHS) as a coeducational school located in Al Nakheel, Ras Al Khaimah, United Arab Emirates.

The school was founded in 1986 and is run as a private institution.

The school is up to senior secondary level (XI–XII) and is affiliated to the Central Board of Secondary Education (CBSE). The school is a coeducational day school, with classes from Kindergarten 1 to XII and teaching in English.

References

External links
 IPHS official website

1986 establishments in the United Arab Emirates
Educational institutions established in 1986
Schools in the Emirate of Ras Al Khaimah
Private schools in the United Arab Emirates
Indian international schools in the United Arab Emirates
Day schools